Liam McMahon (born 1976) is a Northern Irish actor. His work includes roles in Hunger, The Secret (2016) and Without You (2011).

He won critical acclaim for his role in the 2008 film Hunger, which was directed by Steve McQueen and written by Enda Walsh. The film premiered in Cannes 2008, where it opened the official sidebar section, Un Certain Regard and went on to win the Golden Camera award (Camera d'or). Hunger received seven Irish Film & Television Awards [IFTAs].

Filmography

References

External links 

Male film actors from Northern Ireland
1976 births
Living people